A caerdroia is a Welsh turf maze, usually in the sevenfold Cretan labyrinth design.  They were created by shepherds on hilltops and were apparently the setting for ritual dances, the nature of which has been lost.  At the centre of each caerdroia was a small hillock—in Welsh, twmpath.  A gathering for folk dancing in Wales is still called a twmpath dawns. It is a typical labyrinth of Welsh but there is a specimen in Italy to Petrella Tifernina discovered by the historian Mario Ziccardi. This specimen is the only one in the Mediterranean area for now.

Etymology
Caerdroea or Caer Droea is a Welsh word meaning "a labyrinth, a maze; maze cut by shepherds in the sward, serving as a puzzle." It also means "Troy, Walls-of-Troy". Variations include Caer Droia and Caerdroia, the latter being the spelling generally used today.

Because of the similarity between Welsh troeau (a plural form of tro 'turn') and the second element Troea ('Troy'), the name was later popularly interpreted as meaning 'fortress of turns' (caer = 'fort'). 

Many turf mazes in England were named Troy Town or The Walls of Troy (or variations on that theme) presumably because, in popular legend, the walls of the city of Troy were constructed in such a confusing and complex way that any enemy who entered them would be unable to find his way out.

Gwydir Forest

There is a Caerdroia in Gwydir Forest, above the Conwy Valley, Wales. It is a permanent Forest Labyrinth, built in 2005 by Theatre Cynefin, Golygfa Gwydyr (a social enterprise based in Llanrwst), and local young people. The paths measure a mile in length, making it possibly the largest labyrinth of its kind in the world. The Caerdroia has been a venue for a number of performances, initially by Theatr Cynefin, and since 2012 by Theatr Dan-y-Coed. Since its inception and construction on a grassy site at Pen-y-Parc, one of the highest parts of the forest, the low conifers between the paths have grown considerably, and it is now an integral part of the forest.

Mythical link
There is another tenuous connection between Wales and Troy that has been disproven by historians but remains a resilient myth.  Geoffrey of Monmouth, following the early Welsh historian Nennius, created a Christian/classical genealogy which placed Brutus of Troy, grandson of Aeneas and liberator of enslaved Trojans, as founder of Britain. This Brutus is generally considered a medieval fiction.

References

Further reading
Adrian Fisher & Georg Gerster, The Art of the Maze, Weidenfeld & Nicolson (1990) 
Jeff Saward, Magical Paths, Mitchell Beazley (2002) 
Janet & Colin Bord, Mysterious Britain, Paladin Granada (1974) 
Kermann Kern, Labyrinthe: Erscheinungsformen und Deutungen: 5000 Jahre Gegenwart eines Urbilds (German Edition), (1981) 
Mario Ziccardi, "The Labyrinth Graffito at Petrella Tifernina, Italy", in, "Caerdroia, The Journal of Mazes&Labyrinths n°44", p.57 (2015)

External links
W.H. Matthews, Mazes and Labyrinths (1922) online version of W.H. Matthew's classic book
Labyrinthos Jeff Saward's website
Labyrinth Society
The Megalithic Portal
Labyrinth Locator (Veriditas & Labyrinth Society)
Well-illustrated labyrinth site (in German)

Welsh folklore
Mazes
Welsh mythology
Ritual dances